XHXI-FM is a radio station on 99.5 FM in Ixtapan de la Sal, State of Mexico, Mexico. XHXI-FM is owned by Capital Media and is known as Lokura FM with an adult hits format.

History
XEXI-AM, operating at 1400 kHz, received its concession on July 17, 1972. It operated with 250 watts and was owned by Ruben Marín y Kall. In 1978, Graciela Barrera y de la Garza bought XEXI, and by the 1980s, its power was 1 kW. For many years, it was known as "La I de Ixtapan".

In 2015, the station was transferred to Capital Media.

On June 20, 2018, the IFT approved the migration of XEXI-AM to FM, under the 2008 AM-FM migration decree, as XHXI-FM on 99.5 MHz. XHXI signed on September 3, 2018.

On August 20, 2019, XHXI became romantic "La Romántica". On June 8, 2020, XHXI was one of seven stations to debut the new Lokura FM adult hits brand. On the same day, the station left AM for good.

References

1972 establishments in Mexico
Radio stations established in 1972
Radio stations in the State of Mexico